Malden is a town in the Dutch municipality of Heumen, Gelderland. 
Malden is situated straight to the south of the City of Nijmegen. Malden is also home to the town hall of Heumen. Malden's football club is called SV Juliana '31.

History 
The village was first mentioned in 1247 as de Maldene, and means people's meeting / court of justice. Malden developed between the moraine and the river bank in the Early Middle Ages. Later, it developed into a linear settlement along the road (nowadays: N844).

Malden was home to 680 people in 1840, which increased to 10,930 by 2021.

Gallery

References 

Populated places in Gelderland
Heumen